Ouarkziz is a meteorite impact crater in Algeria. It is 3.5 kilometers in diameter and the age is estimated to be less than 70 million years (Cretaceous or younger). The crater is exposed at the surface.

The Ouarkziz Impact Crater is located in northwestern Algeria, close to the border with Morocco. The crater was formed by a meteor impact less than 70 million years ago, during the late Cretaceous Period of the Mesozoic Era.

Originally called Tindouf, the 3.5-kilometer wide crater has been heavily eroded since its formation; however, its circular morphology is highlighted by exposures of older sedimentary rock layers that form roughly northwest to southeast-trending ridgelines. From the vantage point of an astronaut on the International Space Station, the impact crater is clearly visible with a magnifying camera lens.

A geologist interpreting this image to build a geological history of the region would conclude that the Ouarkziz crater is younger than the sedimentary rocks, as the rock layers had to be already present for the meteor to hit them. Likewise, a stream channel is visible cutting across the center of the structure, indicating that the channel formed after the impact had occurred. This Principal of Cross-Cutting Relationships, usually attributed to the 19th century geologist Charles Lyell, is a basic logic tool used by geologists to build relative sequence and history of events when investigating a region.

See also 

 List of impact craters in Africa

References

Further reading 
 Fabre, J., Kazi-Tani, N. and Megartsi,M., The "circle" of Ouarkziz (northwestern Sahara), an astrobleme? (in French). Comptes Rendus, Academie des Sciences, Paris, v. 270, serie D, pp. 1212–1215. 1970
 Koeberl, C., African meteorite impact craters: Characteristics and geological importance. Journal of African Sciences, v. 18, pp. 263–295. 1994
 Lambert, P., McHone, J.F. Jr., Dietz, R.S., Briedj, M. and Djender,M., Impact and impact-like structures in Algeria. Part II, multi-ringed structures. Meteoritics, v. 16, pp. 203–227. 1981

External links 
 Ouarkziz Impact Crater at NASA Earth Observatory 
Satellite image by NASA

Impact craters of Algeria
Cretaceous impact craters
Late Cretaceous Africa
Geography of Tindouf Province